Sweden was formally a non-belligerent nation throughout World War II, but saw considerable military build-up as the level of threat from the Soviet Union or Nazi Germany increased. Between 10,000 and 20,000 Swedes fought as volunteers abroad, a majority of them in service of Finland during the Winter War.

Army

Small arms 

In the early stages of the war, Sweden relied on a numerous army through conscription and the use of a Total Defence policy. In 1945, the Swedish army had been modernized from the use of World War I weapons to semi-automatic rifles and high-tech firearms such as the Carl Gustav. The infantry had also been equipped with a great deal of rocket launchers for anti-tank warfare, and the availability of artillery had increased drastically with the World War II build-up.

Armoured fighting vehicles 

At the beginning of World War II, Sweden had a very low number of motorized vehicles, instead relying horses for transportation. When the war broke out in 1939, Sweden had one armoured division consisting of merely 13 light tanks, only 3 of which were considered to be modern (the remaining 10 had been in service since the 1920s). In 1945, the number of tanks serving the Swedish army had increased from 13 to more than 800.

Number of tanks pre-war: 14

Number of tanks in 1939: 29

Number of tanks in 1940: 38

Number of tanks in 1941: 135

Number of tanks in 1942: 373

Number of tanks in 1943: 544

Number of tanks in 1944: 795

Number of tanks in 1945: 795+

Artillery 

Sweden's artillery corps was made to specialize in mobility and warfare in the Swedish homeland terrain, which mostly consisted of thick forests and small, remote towns. Anti-aircraft warfare was considered important even before the war began, due to Sweden's small aircraft capacity in the 1930s. The Bofors 40 mm, a Swedish auto cannon, was exported to most warring countries in thousands of examples, making it the most common anti-aircraft weapon of the war.

In addition to these weapons, Sweden also possessed 9 unspecified heavy anti-aircraft guns with a caliber of 105 mm.

Navy 
The Swedish government saw a strong naval defense against a possible Soviet invasion as a high priority during World War II, and like with the rest of Sweden's military the Royal Navy lived through an enormous enhancement, ending up as the second-strongest naval power of the Baltic Sea after the Soviet Union.

Coastal defence ships

Cruisers

Destroyers
Number of destroyers pre-war: 13

Number of destroyers in 1939: 14

Number of destroyers in 1940: 19

Number of destroyers in 1941: 20

Number of destroyers in 1942: 23

Number of destroyers in 1943: 27

Number of destroyers in 1944: 28

Number of destroyers in 1945: 28

Submarine chasers

Patrol boats

Mine warfare ships

Auxiliary ships

Air force 
Sweden's air force at the beginning of World War II was relatively small and lacked modern radar systems, engines, or weaponry. This changed during the build-up in the 1940s, though, eventually providing Sweden with an aircraft storage that was both numerous and of high quality, in preparation for the Cold War.

Fighter aircraft

Just as the rest of the Swedish Armed Forces, the number of fighter aircraft increased drastically from 98 before the war to almost 600 in 1945. 239 additional aircraft were manufactured immediately after the war.

Number of fighters pre-war: 98

Number of fighters in 1939: 158

Number of fighters in 1940: 290

Number of fighters in 1941: 290

Number of fighters in 1942: 485

Number of fighters in 1943: 485

Number of fighters in 1944: 485

Number of fighters in 1945: 593

Number of fighters post-war: 832

Bomber aircraft

During World War II the Swedish government maintained a neutral (alternatively, defensive) stance and thus saw no priority in adding offensive aircraft to the air force. Despite this, a fairly large number of bombers and ground-attack aircraft served in the Swedish air force during World War II and after, possibly for intimidation purposes - in fact, after 1940, Sweden had more bombers than fighter aircraft. These offensive aircraft may have been meant to attack Soviet naval bases in the Baltic Sea, and some of the later designs could even reach Moscow with full payload.

Number of bombers pre-war: 88

Number of bombers in 1939: 116

Number of bombers in 1940: 276

Number of bombers in 1941: 346

Number of bombers in 1942: 534

Number of bombers in 1943: 743

Number of bombers in 1944: 775

Number of bombers in 1945: 879

Auxiliary aircraft

See also 
List of equipment of the Swedish Armed Forces
Military equipment of Sweden during the Cold War

References

Sources and further reading 
http://www.beredskapstid.se/cms/index.php?option=com_frontpage&Itemid=76
https://web.archive.org/web/20120109074948/http://www.sphf.se/Axvall/samling.htm
http://www2.landskrona.se/kultur/landsverk/militart/pansarstart.html
http://ww2db.com/country/sweden

World War II military equipment of Sweden